Jenna Elizabeth Prandini (born November 20, 1992) is an American track and field athlete, known for sprinting, but originally began her career doing jumping events. She is a two-time national champion at 200 meters (2015, 2018), a 2016 Olympian, and a 2020 Olympic silver medalist.

Professional
Before Prandini’s 2015 national title, she won the 100 meters at the 2015 NCAA Division I Outdoor Track and Field Championships as a Senior at the University of Oregon. The previous year, she won the long jump. She also was a runner up in the 200 meters both years, runner up in the long jump in 2015 and finished third in the 100 meters in 2014. Prandini is the second female to win the NCAA 100 meters & USA National Outdoor 200 meters in the same year. In 2015, she won the Honda Sports Award as the nation's best female track and field competitor.

Prandini qualified for the 2016 Summer Olympics in the 200 meters by placing third at the 2016 Olympic Trials. At the 2016 Summer Olympics in Rio, she finished 10th in the 200 meters.

Prandini came to the University of Oregon with the same triple threat credentials, winning all three events (100m, 200m and long jump) at the 2011 CIF California State Meet for Clovis High School in Clovis, California. In her junior year, she won both the long jump and triple jump and also finished second in the 100 meters.  In 2011, she also won the US Junior Championship in the long jump.

By coincidence, all of Prandini's major championships have essentially occurred at home. The CIF meet is held in Clovis at cross town Buchanan High School, the NCAA Championships and USA Outdoor Championships were at Hayward Field at the University of Oregon, though for the Junior Championships, also at Hayward Field, she moved to Oregon for school three months later.

In 2015, Jenna Prandini achieved the 2016 Olympic standard in the 100 meters, 200 meters and long jump. In 2021, she achieved the 2020 Olympic standard in the 100 meters and 200 meters. Prandini represented the United States in both events at the 2020 Summer Olympics in Tokyo, and she helped Team USA capture a silver medal in the 4×100 m relay by running the third leg of the relay.

National titles
USA Outdoor Track and Field Championships
200-meter dash: 2018
USA Outdoor Track and Field Championships
200-meter dash: 2015
NCAA Women's Division I Outdoor Track and Field Championships
Long jump: 2014
100-meter dash: 2015
NCAA Women's Division I Indoor Track and Field Championships
Long jump: 2015

Personal records
100-meter dash – 10.92 seconds (2015)
200-meter dash – 21.89 seconds (2021)
Long jump –  (2015)
Triple jump –  (2010)

Indoor personal records
60-meter dash indoor – 7.15 seconds (2015)
200-meter dash indoor – 22.52 seconds (2015)
Long jump –  (2015)

Major Competitions

References

External links

Oregon Ducks biography

Living people
1992 births
Sportspeople from Clovis, California
Track and field athletes from California
American female long jumpers
American female triple jumpers
American female sprinters
Oregon Ducks women's track and field athletes
World Athletics Championships athletes for the United States
World Athletics Championships medalists
Athletes (track and field) at the 2016 Summer Olympics
USA Outdoor Track and Field Championships winners
IAAF Continental Cup winners
Athletes (track and field) at the 2020 Summer Olympics
Medalists at the 2020 Summer Olympics
Olympic silver medalists for the United States in track and field
American people of Italian descent